Hugh Albert Harris "Red" McCusker (June 28, 1895 – September 1979) was a Canadian professional ice hockey goaltender who played in various professional and amateur leagues, including the Western Canada Hockey League. Amongst the teams he played with were the Regina Capitals.

He died at the age of 84 at Toronto in 1979.

References

External links

1895 births
1979 deaths
Canadian ice hockey goaltenders
Portland Rosebuds players
Regina Capitals players
Western Canada Hockey League players